Reclinghem is a commune in the Pas-de-Calais department in the Hauts-de-France region of France. It was settled by the Viking Rikiwulf (the rich and powerful wolf) in the 9th century, who probably also settled nearby Richebourg and Rijkeghem in present Tielt, Belgium.

Geography
Reclinghem lies about 12 miles (19 km) south of Saint-Omer, on the D104 road, by the banks of the river Lys.

Population

Places of interest
 The eighteenth century church of St. Firmin.

See also
Communes of the Pas-de-Calais department

References

Communes of Pas-de-Calais